...with Love is the second studio album from Irish singer-songwriter, Mary Byrne. The album was released on 25 November 2011 in Ireland, and 5 March 2012 in the UK. The album was produced by Phil Coulter. The album peaked to number 10 on the Irish Albums Chart.

Background 
On 13 September 2011, it was announced that Mary Byrne had asked to end her record deal with Sony, and asked to switch to Universal. It was later announced that she had started working on a second album, produced by Phil Coulter, to be released in Ireland by Universal Music Ireland, and in the UK by Decca UK. On 2 November, Mary Byrne stated on her Facebook page that her new album was to be released in Ireland on 25 November. Her management team later announced that the album would be released the following year in March for the UK.

Promotion 
She appeared on The Late Late Show the day of Ireland release, and talked to Ryan Tubridy after performing a song on the album called 'Thank God That This Was My Life' written for her by Phil Coulter. Mary is due to have a concert featuring her latest songs from the album with Phil Coulter in the Olympia Theatre on 8 May 2012. The public demand on ticket sales was so overwhelming, 5 extra nights were added, evidently resulting in a total of a 6 night residency that ended on 13 May.

Track listing
Source: iTunes

Chart performance

References

2011 albums
Mary Byrne (singer) albums
Sony Music Ireland albums
Decca Records albums
Covers albums